The 2007–08 season was the 77th in the history of the Segunda División (known as the Liga BBVA for sponsorship reasons), the second tier of the Spanish football league system. The first matches of the season were played on 25 August 2007, and the season ended on 15 June 2008. Celta de Vigo, Real Sociedad, and Gimnàstic de Tarragona were the teams which were relegated from La Liga the previous season. Racing de Ferrol, Eibar, Sevilla Atlético, and Córdoba were the teams which were promoted from Segunda División B the previous season.

The first goal of the season was scored by Joseba del Olmo, who scored an 18th-minute goal for Eibar against Racing de Ferrol in the early kick-off. The first red card of the competition was given to Miguel Cobas of Las Palmas after a challenge on Numancia's Gorka Brit. The first hat-trick was scored by Yordi in the match between Xerez and Hércules.

Teams 

It was made up of the following teams:

League table

Results

Pichichi Trophy

Zamora Trophy

Season statistics

Scoring 
 First goal of the season: Joseba del Olmo for Eibar against Racing de Ferrol (25 August 2007)
 Fastest goal in a match: 10 seconds – Nabil Baha for Málaga against Cádiz (5 January 2008)
 Goal scored at the latest point in a match: 90+6 minutes – Quique Martín for Salamanca against Granada 74 (16 September 2007)
 Widest winning margin: 4
 Sporting Gijón 4–0 Polideportivo Ejido (26 August 2007) 
 Real Sociedad 4–0 Las Palmas (17 February 2008)
 Eibar 4–0 Tenerife (22 March 2008)
 Hércules 5–1 Eibar (26 April 2008)
 Most goals in a match: 10 – Málaga 4-6 Hércules (18 May 2008)
 First hat-trick of the season: Yordi for Xerez against Hércules (27 January 2008)
 First own goal of the season: Jordi Ferrón for Hércules against Albacete (9 September 2007)
 Most goals by one player in a single match: 3
 Yordi for Xerez against Hércules (27 January 2008)
 Asier Goiria for Eibar against Tenerife (22 March 2008)
 Antonio Hidalgo for Málaga against Hércules (18 May 2008)
 Most goals by one team in a match: 6 – Málaga 4–6 Hércules (18 May 2008)
 Most goals in one half by one team: 5 – Málaga 4–6 Hércules (18 May 2008)
 Most goals scored by losing team: 4 – Málaga 4–6 Hércules (18 May 2008)

Cards 
 First yellow card: Diego Jaume for Hércules against Xerez (25 August 2007)
 First red card: Miguel Cobas for Las Palmas against Numancia (25 August 2007)

2007-08
2
Spain